Stoke Goldington is a village and civil parish in the unitary authority area of the City of Milton Keynes, Buckinghamshire, England. It is located about four miles NNW of Newport Pagnell, on the road to Northampton.

History

The village name 'Stoke' derives from the Old English 'stoc', which means 'place'. It came to be used in the context of either a religious or a secondary settlement, and is one of the most common place name elements in England (see Stoke (disambiguation)). In the Domesday Book of 1086 the village was recorded as Stoche.  The affix 'Goldington' came later and refers to "Peter de Goldington" (from Goldington in Bedfordshire) who held the manor in the early thirteenth century.

Listed buildings and structures
The parish has one grade I listed building, and 33 at grade II.

Parish church
The parish church is dedicated to St Peter and is a grade I listed building. The earliest parts of the building date from the 12th century.

Flooding
Stoke Goldington is susceptible to occasional flooding, and suffered badly in 2007 with repeated floods. Water settled up to 1.5 metres deep in places, requiring the evacuation of some of the population. Subsequently, contractors for Milton Keynes City Council installed measures to reduce the flood risk. In May 2018, there was another flood, that overcame the new flood defences.

References

External links
 Stoke Goldington Association web site  History, census data, old photographs and more.
 

Villages in Buckinghamshire
Areas of Milton Keynes
Civil parishes in Buckinghamshire